Steuerberg is a town in the district of Feldkirchen in the Austrian state of Carinthia.

Geography
Steuerberg lies in the Gurktal Alps between the Gurk valley and the Wimitz valley, about 10 km north of Feldkirchen.

Neighboring municipalities

References

Cities and towns in Feldkirchen District